Escape Artist is an album by Garland Jeffreys, released in 1981 by Epic Records. The album originally included the EP Escapades. The cover photography is by Anton Corbijn.

The album peaked at No. 59 on the Billboard 200.

Production
The album was produced by Jeffreys and Bob Clearmountain, with added EP tracks produced by Dennis Bovell. The backing band included musicians from the E Street Band, the Wailers, and the Rumour, as well as Adrian Belew.

Critical reception
AllMusic called the album "a set of tough, witty songs that dealt with the personal and the political, backed by an exceptional studio band that included members of Bruce Springsteen's E-Street Band and Graham Parker's Rumour." The Washington Post wrote that "this is essentially the same stuff that made your parents wince and your girlfriend wiggle, back when rock'n 'roll aspired less to Art than to aphrodisia." Time wrote: "Jeffreys' ambitious and sophisticated synthesis of rock, reggae and jazz could easily become top-heavy. The cool inflections of his passion, however, keep the songs strong and upright, buttressed both by a flair for elegant concert showmanship and a voice that sounds like Frankie Lymon with a college education."

Track listing
All tracks composed by Garland Jeffreys; except where indicated
 "Modern Lovers" - 3:59
 "Christine" - 3:30
 "Ghost of a Chance" - 2:49
 "96 Tears" (Rudy Martinez) - 3:08
 "Innocent" - 2:21
 "True Confessions" - 4:33
 "R.O.C.K." - 3:56
 "Graveyard Rock" - 4:36
 "Mystery Kids" - 7:08
 "Jump Jump" - 4:37

"Escapades" 7"

 "Lover's Walk" (lyrics: Garland Jeffreys; music: Alan Freeman, Andrew Bodnar, Danny Federici, G.E. Smith, Garland Jeffreys, Roy Bittan, Steve Goulding) - 4:46
 "Christine" - 4:35
 "Miami Beach" - 4:53
 "We the People" - 4:27

Charts

Personnel 
Garland Jeffreys - lead and backing vocals, guitar
Robert Athas - guitars, bass
Adrian Belew - guitars, bagpipe guitar
Big Youth - toasting, vocals on "Graveyard Rock"
Roy Bittan - piano
Eaton "Jah" Blake - bass on "Miami Beach" and "We the People" 
Andrew Bodnar - bass
Dennis "Blackbeard" Bovell - guitars, keyboards, percussion on "Miami Beach" and "We the People"
Michael Brecker - tenor saxophone
Randy Brecker - trumpet
Bob Clearmountain - producer, mixer, backing vocals
Larry Fast - synthesizer
Danny Federici - accordion, keyboards
Alan "Taff" Freedman - guitars, music consultant
Artie Funaro - guitars, keyboards
Steve Goulding - drums, percussion, backing vocals
Diana Grasselli - backing vocals
Chuck Hammer - guitar synths on "Mystery Kids" and "Jump Jump"
Nona Hendryx - "hung jury" vocals on "Innocent"
David Johansen - "hung jury" vocals on "Innocent"
Susan Blond - "hung jury" vocals on "Innocent"
Linton Kwesi Johnson - vocals/narration on "Miami Beach"
Webster Johnson - keyboards, percussion on "Miami Beach" and "We the People"
John Kpiaye - guitars on "Miami Beach" and "We the People"
Earl "Wire" Lindo - organ
Jimmy Maelen  - percussion
Errol "Tamah" Melbourne - drums on "Miami Beach" and "We the People"
Seyoum Net Fa - melodica on "Miami Beach" and "We the People"
Lou Reed - backing vocals on "Innocent"
G.E. Smith - guitars, fuzz bass, mandolin
Augustus "I" Tenyve (Henry Tenyue) - saxophone, trombone on "Miami Beach" and "We the People"
Myriam Naomi Valle - backing vocals
Maria Vidal - backing vocals
Patric "Zebulon" Tenyve (Patrick Tenyue) - flugelhorn on "Miami Beach" and "We the People"
Technical
Dick Wingate - Executive Producer
Barbara Spiegel - production coordinator
Dave Greenberg, Raymond Willard - engineer

References

1981 albums
Garland Jeffreys albums
Albums produced by Bob Clearmountain
A&M Records albums
Epic Records albums